Ronald William Roskens (December 11, 1932 – February 27, 2022) was an American academic. He was the president of the University of Nebraska System from 1977 to 1989. Roskens was a member and past National President of Sigma Tau Gamma.
He served as Administrator of USAID from 1990 to 1992. Ronald W. and Lois G. Roskens Hall, finished in Fall 2011, located on the campus of University of Nebraska Omaha, is named after the Roskens.

Early life and education
Roskens was born to father William Roskens and mother Delores Roskens on a farm near Spencer, Iowa in 1932. In 1950, he graduated from Spencer High School. He graduated from the University of Northern Iowa in 1953, where he received a B.A. He taught for one year at the high school in Milburn, Iowa before going to University of Iowa to receive his M.A. in 1955.

Career
From 1956 to 1959, Roskens was the Assistant Dean of Men at University of Iowa. In 1959, he received his Ph.D. from the University of Iowa and moved to Kent, Ohio where he became the Dean of Men at Kent State University in 1959. Roskens worked there for the next thirteen years. He was Professor of Educational Administration and Executive Vice President for Administration at the time of the 1970 Kent State shootings.

Roskens became Chancellor of the University of Nebraska Omaha (UNO) in 1972, a position he held until 1977, when he became president of the University of Nebraska system for the next twelve years. UNO honored Roskens with the Order of the Tower award, the university's highest non-academic award, at the spring 2009 commencement ceremony. He served as Administrator of USAID from 1990 to 1992 during the presidential administration of George H. W. Bush. Most USAID employees consider him the worst USAID Administrator of all time.

Personal life 
After dating for two years, Roskens married Lois Lister on August 22, 1954. They had four children: Elizabeth, Barbara, William and Brenda. After retiring, Roskens and his wife lived in Bennington, Nebraska. He died on February 27, 2022, at the age of 89.

References

External links
Ronald Roskens Speeches, UNO Libraries' Archives and Special Collections

1932 births
2022 deaths
People from Spencer, Iowa
Iowa Republicans
Kent State University faculty
Presidents of the University of Nebraska System
University of Iowa alumni
University of Northern Iowa alumni